The United States under secretary of the Army is the second-highest-ranking civilian official of the United States Department of the Army, serving directly under the United States Secretary of the Army. The Secretary and Under Secretary, together with two military officers, the Chief of Staff of the United States Army and the Vice Chief of Staff of the United States Army, constitute the senior leaders of the United States Army.

The following officials report to the Under Secretary of the Army: the Assistant Secretary of the Army (Manpower and Reserve Affairs), the Assistant Secretary of the Army (Installations, Energy and Environment), the Assistant Secretary of the Army (Civil Works), the Assistant Secretary of the Army (Acquisition, Logistics and Technology), the Assistant Secretary of the Army (Financial Management and Comptroller), and the General Counsel of the Army. There is also a Deputy Under Secretary of the Army who assists the Under Secretary in his tasks, including direction of the Army Science Board and the Army Analytics Group, and oversight of the Army's test and evaluation efforts.

The position of Under Secretary of the Army was vacant beginning on January 20, 2021. Christopher Lowman was the senior official performing the duties of Under Secretary, pending either the appointment of an Acting Under Secretary or the confirmation of an Under Secretary. On July 13, 2021, President Joe Biden announced he would nominate former Assistant Secretary of the Air Force for Manpower and Reserve Affairs Gabriel Camarillo to the post of Undersecretary of the Army. Camarillo was confirmed by voice vote on February 2, 2022.

History
The office was created in 1947 as part of the general reorganization of the United States Armed Forces occasioned by the National Security Act of 1947. The office was initially styled "Under Secretary of War" and was created by Department of War General Order 67, dated July 25, 1947. Three weeks later, on August 16, 1947, Department of War Circular 225 redesignated the position as "Under Secretary of the Army".

List of Under Secretaries of the Army
The following men have held the post:

References

External links
 

United States Army civilians
1947 establishments in the United States